Antoine Bailleux was an 18th-century Parisian violinist and music publisher, active from 1761 to 1800 or 1801.

Biography 

Bailleux was music seller of the Chambre et des Menus Plaisirs du Roi between 1772 and 1778 ; then ordinary music dealer of the King and the royal family from 1779 to the Revolution.

He was the main publisher of composers Jean-Baptiste Davaux, Joseph Bologne de Saint-George and Gossec but he also published works by Grétry, Jean-Frédéric Edelmann, Johann Baptist Wanhal, Ignaz Fränzl, Ernst Eichner, Dittersdorf, Ivan Mane Jarnović (Giornovichi), Karl Joseph Toeschi, Tommaso Giordani  Luigi Boccherini and Wolfgang Amadeus Mozart.

In 1777, he published under the number XXVI and the name Joseph Haydn, a set of six string quartets later referred to as Opus 3. 
Since the 1960s, the collection is rather attributed to great admirer of J. Haydn, and friend of Joseph Martin Kraus, the German composer Roman Hofstetter. This practice was quite common among publishers, wishing to improve the distribution of their production. Hofstetter would have sold less than Haydn.

His Parisian addresses appearing on the title pages of his publications were: 
 Rue Porte-au-Foin, near rue des Enfants-Rouges 
 Rue Saint-Honoré (near rue de la Ferronnerie ; vis-à-vis rue des Bourdonnais ; near rue de la Lingerie, n° 198) 
 Rue (previously Honoré and now) d'Orléans, n° 17 (near rue des Deux-Écus ; quartier Honoré ; hôtel du Mouton)
 Rue des Deux-Écus, n° 22.

His sign read "À la Règle d'or".

The Erard ladies were mentioned as "successors of defunct Bailey" in 1802.

Some historians (including Fétis) gave a death date too old by ten years, whereas the Almanach du commerce de Paris from 1800–1801 still mentions him.

Method 
Bailleux authored a Méthode raisonnée pour apprendre à jouer du violon avec le doigté de cet instrument et les différents agréments dont il est susceptible, précédée des principes de musique.

Bibliography 
 Anik Devriès and François Lesure, Dictionnaire des éditeurs de musique français : Des origines a environ 1820, vol. 1, Geneva, Minkoff, coll. "Archives de l'édition musicale française" (no 4, 1), 1979, 203 p.
 Rudolf Rasch (dir.), Music Publishing in Europe 1600-1900 : Concepts and Issues Bibliography, Berlin, Berliner Wissenschafts-Verlag, coll. "Musical life in Europe 1600-1900, Circulation of music" (no 1), 2005, 314 p. (read online

See also 
 Répertoire international des sources musicales

References

External links 
 Some original editions on IMSLP

1720 births
1800 deaths
French music publishers (people)
18th-century French male classical violinists
Music publishing companies of France